Item may refer to:

Organizations 
 Instituto del Tercer Mundo (ITeM), the Third World Institute
 ITEM club, an economic forecasting group based in the United Kingdom

Newspapers 
 The Item, an American independent, morning newspaper published in Sumter, South Carolina
 The Huntsville Item, an American seven-day morning daily newspaper published in Huntsville, Texas
 Picayune Item, an American five-day daily newspaper published in Picayune, Mississippi

Other uses 
 Item (gaming), objects in a video game collected by the player character to increase the score or progress through the story
 Item (EP), first release by the band Onetwo
 Digital Item, the basic unit of transaction in the MPEG-21 framework
 Item number, musical performance in Indian cinema
 Item (TV series), a 2019 South Korean television series
 ITEM, a group in the light novel and anime franchise A Certain Magical Index

See also 
 
 
 The Daily Item (disambiguation)